Mohamed Ali Yacoubi (born 5 October 1990) is a Tunisian professional footballer who plays as a defender for Espérance de Tunis.

Honours
Club Africain
 CAF Confederation Cup runner-up: 2011

References

External links
 

1990 births
Living people
Tunisian footballers
Association football defenders
Tunisia international footballers
2015 Africa Cup of Nations players
2017 Africa Cup of Nations players
Süper Lig players
Saudi Professional League players
Ligue 2 players
Çaykur Rizespor footballers
JS Kairouan players
Al-Fateh SC players
US Quevilly-Rouen Métropole players
Espérance Sportive de Tunis players
Expatriate footballers in Turkey
Expatriate footballers in Saudi Arabia
Tunisian expatriate sportspeople in Turkey
Tunisian expatriate sportspeople in Saudi Arabia